Jack Howe may refer to:
Jack Howe (footballer, born 1915) (1915–1987), English footballer
Jack Howe (Australian footballer) (1922–2001), Australian rules footballer
Jack Howe (architect) (1911–2003), architect and industrial designer

See also
Jackie Howe (1861–1920), Australian sheep shearer
John Howe (disambiguation)